Associação Desportiva de Oeiras is a Portuguese football club located in Oeiras, Portugal.

Colours and badge 
Oeiras' colours are red and white.

External links 
 Official website
 Soccerway Profile
 Fora de Jogo Profile

AD Oeiras
Football clubs in Portugal
Association football clubs established in 1906
1906 establishments in Portugal